Dmitry Anatolyevich Kozonchuk (born 5 April 1984 in Voronezh) is a Russian professional road bicycle racer, who last rode for UCI Professional Continental team .

In 2012, he rode for UCI Professional Continental Team , before joining  in 2013. He was named in the start list for the 2015 Tour de France.

Major results

2002
 8th Time trial, UCI Junior Road World Championships
2003
 4th Flèche Ardennaise
2004
 1st Stage 2 Olympia's Tour
 1st Stage 3 Triptyque des Barrages
2005
 1st  Overall Cinturón a Mallorca
1st Stage 3
 1st Paris–Roubaix Espoirs
 7th Road race, UEC European Under-23 Road Championships
2006
 2nd Overall Le Triptyque des Monts et Châteaux
1st Stages 2b & 3
 2nd Overall Tour de la Somme
 3rd Liège–Bastogne–Liège Espoirs
 5th Overall Thüringen Rundfahrt der U23
1st Stage 2
 8th Overall Vuelta Ciclista a León
2009
 9th Hel van het Mergelland

Grand Tour general classification results timeline

References

External links

Dmitry Kozonchuk's profile at Cycling Base

Russian male cyclists
1984 births
Living people
Sportspeople from Voronezh